Karolina Šprem Baghdatis (born 25 October 1984) is a retired professional tennis player from Croatia. She won eleven titles (ten singles) all at the ITF level. Her highest ranking is world No. 17, achieved in October 2004.

Personal life
Karolina was born to Gabro and Božena Šprem in Varaždin, SFRY. She was introduced to tennis by her father at nine years of age. She turned professional in July 2001.

Šprem represented Croatia at the 2004 Summer Olympics held in Athens. She reached the third round in singles and the second round in doubles (with Jelena Kostanić).

On 14 July 2012, Šprem married ATP player Marcos Baghdatis at Trakošćan Castle in Croatia. At Wimbledon, as a spectator for Baghdatis' match on centre court against Andy Murray, Šprem confirmed that she and Baghdatis were expecting their first child. Karolina gave birth to a girl, named Zahara, on 20 October 2012.

Professional career

2003–2006
Šprem displayed stunning results at the beginning of the 2003 season. Playing on the ITF Circuit, she had a record 29-match winning streak from January to March, which earned her four titles at Grenoble, Southampton, Redbridge and Castellon.

Later in the year, she went on to reach two WTA-level finals in Strasbourg and Vienna. She also reached the semifinals of the WTA Tour event in Helsinki, and won the ITF event in Poitiers.

Šprem's career highlight came at Wimbledon 2004, where she was a quarterfinalist. She defeated the then-two-time champion, four-time finalist and world no. 8 Venus Williams en route. Her run was ended by Lindsay Davenport. The umpire of her match against Venus had awarded her an extra point in the second set tiebreak by mistake.

After Wimbledon, Karolina struggled to find her good form she had, losing early in many tournaments. She began training with Borna Bikić.

She rebounded at the Australian Open 2005, where she had a run to the fourth round. In September 2005, at the WTA event in Kolkata, India, she reached the final after a string of good wins. However, she lost the final to Anastasia Myskina.

2007–2009

In late 2007, Šprem announced a permanent split from Bikic and returned to her old coach Ricardo Sanchez. She had to cope with a serious elbow injury, which needed surgery. She was out of the tour for 10 months.

In April 2008, she returned to the pro tour, winning in Amelia Island over Ai Sugiyama and top-10 player Daniela Hantuchová, before falling to Lindsay Davenport in the third round.

In July, Šprem made the semifinals of a Tier III event in Budapest.

In 2009, Karolina won three big ITF titles in Biberach, Torhout, and Mestre.

2010–2011
In 2010, she scored one of her biggest wins in years when she defeated 25th seed Anabel Medina Garrigues at the Australian Open.

During the Australian hard-court season in 2011, Karolina suffered a left-wrist injury, which forced her to stop competing. She tried playing in April at the tournament in Estoril, Portugal, but was unable to finish her first qualifying match against Heather Watson. This confirmed that the injury was very serious. She has been out of the tour since, and is still recovering.

WTA career finals

Singles: 3 (3 runners-up)

ITF Circuit finals

Singles: 14 (10–4)

Doubles (1–0)

Grand Slam singles performance timeline

References

External links

 
 
 

1984 births
Living people
Croatian female tennis players
Olympic tennis players of Croatia
Sportspeople from Varaždin
Tennis players at the 2004 Summer Olympics